Crimmitschau is a town in the district of Zwickau in Saxony, Germany.

Geography
Crimmitschau lies on the river Pleiße in the northern foothills of the Erzgebirge.

Neighboring municipalities
Adjacent communities include: Zwickau, Dennheritz, Neukirchen, Meerane, and Langenbernsdorf in Landkreis of Zwickau; Heyersdorf, Jonaswalde, Ponitz and Thonhausen in Thuringian Landkreis of Altenburger Land; as well as Braunichswalde, Rückersdorf, and Seelingstädt in Thuringia in Landkreis of Greiz.

Municipality subdivisions
The town Crimmitschau consists of Crimmitschau proper and the following five Ortschaften (localities), each containing several Ortsteile or divisions:
Blankenhain (incl. Großpillingsdorf)
Frankenhausen (incl. Gösau and Gosel)
Langenreinsdorf
Lauenhain
Mannichswalde

The Ortsteile Rudelswalde and Gablenz are not part of an Ortschaft.

History
In the course of German eastward expansion, the city of Crimmitschau and a castle of the same name (now called the Schweinsburg) were established from around 1170 to 1200 as an organized German colony. The settlement's existence is first documented in 1212.  In 1414 Crimmitschau received town privileges from Markgraf Wilhelm II.

On 15 March 1844, Crimmitschau was connected to the German rail network (on the Leipzig–Hof railway, which was later extended to Bavaria). Its current station was opened in 1873

Around the turn of the century, Crimmitschau was the site of a large concentrated textile industry, and was called "The City of 100 chimneys" (Stadt der 100 Schornsteine).

From August 22, 1903, to January 18, 1904, it was the site of one of the largest and longest strikes in the German Empire, which affected the entire nation.

In 1944, some Crimmitschau property was bombed by Allied Forces.

At the end of the 1980s, a great part of the old and inner cities were torn down and replaced with prefabricated concrete buildings. Similar plans existed for the southern suburb, but were not put in place after the regime change in 1990.

Population

Religion
Even though a majority of the people in Crimmitschau are not affiliated with any religion, there are some Protestant parishes and even a Catholic parish, belonging to the Diocese of Dresden-Meissen.  
The most important churches are: St. Laurentius-Kirche, Johanniskirche, and the Lutherkirche.

Twin towns – sister cities

Crimmitschau is twinned with:
 Bystřice nad Pernštejnem, Czech Republic
 Wiehl, Germany

Sights

Landmarks include the town hall, the late Gothic parish church of Saint Laurentius (Saint Lawrence)(1513), with its star and cross ribbed arches, the former Cistercian nunnery of Frankenhausen Abbey (founded around 1290) in the district of Frankenhausen and the open-air museum of Blankenhain Castle located at the castle of the same name.

Museums
Western Saxon Textile Museum, which is located in a fully functional textile factory, former known as "Gebrüder Pfau KG"
The Agricultural and Open-Air Museum of Schloss Blankenhain

Parks
 The Zöffelpark, which was built in the pre-war period and named after Emil Oskar Zöffel, an important textile manufacturer and Philanthropist in the history of the city.
 The Bismarck-Hain, a former cemetery, named after Reichskanzler Otto von Bismarck. This park was known as Friedenspark (Peace-park) during GDR-times.
 The Sahnpark, located north of the city center, is the largest park in Crimmitschau and harbours an old open-air bath, an animal park and the stadium of ETC Crimmitschau.

Sport
Crimmitschau has a well-known ice hockey club, the ETC Crimmitschau, which plays in the second highest German league. The city also has a soccer team, FC Crimmitschau and an American Football Team, the Tornados Crimmitschau.

Business and infrastructure

Crimmitschau lies directly at the Autobahn A4 and can be reached through the exits Schmölln and Meerane. 
The Deutsche Bahn AG provides connections from Crimmitschau station to Zwickau, Leipzig, Hof.

Education
There are three elementary schools, two secondary schools, a gymnasium, and a special education school  in Crimmitschau.

Notable people
Julius Motteler (1838–1907), Reichstag deputy, co-founder of the Social Democratic Party of Germany
Adolf Paul Schulze (1840–1891), emigrated to Scotland and became a successful merchant and noted microscopist
Heinrich Mauersberger (1909–1982), engineer and inventor in the textile industry
Helmut Bräutigam (1914–1942), composer
Gerhard Zwerenz (1925–2015), writer and former Bundestag deputy
Peter Graf (born 1937), painter
Wolf-Dieter Storl (born 1942), ethnobotanist and author 
Klaus Gruner (born 1954), handball player, Olympic champion 1980
Udo Kießling (born 1955), ice hockey player
Gabi Zange (born 1961), speed skater

Honorary citizen
1895: Otto von Bismarck, chancellor of the Reich
1984: Walter Richter, gardener

References

External links

Coat of Arms
  ETC-Crimmitschau
  the West Saxon Textile Museum of Crimmitschau
  Agricultural and Open-Air Museum of Schloss Blankenhain 
  the Julius-Motteler-Gymnasium of Crimmitschau

 
Zwickau (district)